Kampung Sungai Bari is a main village and settlement in sub-district of Hulu Nerus, located in Setiu District, Terengganu, Malaysia. It is bordered by the Kampung Langkap, Sungai Tong, Sungai Lerek, and Kampong Selamat, can be connected through a network of main roads of Kuala Terengganu to Kelatan capital of Kota Bharu. Its geographical coordinates are 5° 24' 0" North, 102° 51' 0" East and its original name (with diacritics) is Kampong Sungai Bari.

The village is under the administration of JKKK Sungai Bari, democratically elected by vote by the local community each year. There are a variety jurisdiction and duties of the committee, who have full responsibility for the management and communication of information from the government to the people and to allocate funds and assistance delivered by the state or federal government.

Sungai Bari also is a major industrial area in the state of Terengganu. Industrial area located here which put a solar farm for electricity generation which is among the largest in Malaysia.

References

External links
 Twitter Kampung Sungai Bari
 Majlis Daerah Setiu
 Kampung Sungai Bari Local Business Facebook Page
 Kampung Sungai Bari Community Facebook Page

Setiu District
Villages in Terengganu